Stefan Blank (born 10 March 1977) is a German former professional footballer who played as a left-back.

Coaching career
After his retirement he was named as head coach of the SG Wattenscheid 09 U-19 and for the 2009–10 season also as head coach of SG Wattenscheid 09 but resigned in late December 2009.

Honours
VfB Stuttgart
 UEFA Intertoto Cup: 2000

References

1977 births
Living people
Sportspeople from Gelsenkirchen
German footballers
Footballers from North Rhine-Westphalia
Association football fullbacks
Germany B international footballers
Germany under-21 international footballers
Bundesliga players
2. Bundesliga players
FC Schalke 04 players
Hannover 96 players
VfB Stuttgart players
SV Werder Bremen players
FC St. Pauli players
Alemannia Aachen players
1. FC Kaiserslautern players
MSV Duisburg players
SG Wattenscheid 09 players
German football managers
FC Kray managers